Lenaeus is a genus of assassin bugs.

Partial list of species
 Lenaeus indicus Miller, 1954
 Lenaeus pyrrhus Stål, 1859

References

Reduviidae
Cimicomorpha genera